The 25th New Jersey Infantry Regiment was an American Civil War infantry regiment from New Jersey that served a nine-month enlistment in the Union Army.

The 25th New Jersey Infantry Regiment was organized with five companies ("A", "C", "E", "H", & "K") from Passaic County, New Jersey, in Northern New Jersey. Companies F, G and I were recruited from Cape May County, New Jersey, Company D from Cumberland County, New Jersey and Company B from Atlantic County, New Jersey. The regiment trained at Camp in Beverly, before being sent out to Washington, DC. There, it was attached to the 2nd brigade Casey's Division, Defenses of Washington, D. C until December, 1862. Next it was attached to the 1st Brigade, 3rd Division, 9th Army Corps, Army of the Potomac, to February, 1863 and then to the 3rd Brigade until April, 1863. Finally, it was attached to the 3rd Brigade, 2nd Division, 7th Army Corps to June, 1863.

The regiment fought in two engagements–the December, 1862 Battle of Fredericksburg and the Siege of Suffolk, April 11 - May 4, 1863.

Many of the veterans of the 25th New Jersey went on to serve in other regiments, most notably the 33rd New Jersey Volunteer Infantry, and the 38th New Jersey Volunteer Infantry.

Original Field and Staff
Mustered in September, 1862:

Colonel Andrew Derrom
Lieutenant Colonel Enoch J. Ayres (originally vacant)
Major John K. Brown
Adjutant Daniel B. Murphy
Quartermaster James Inglis, Jr. (originally vacant)
Surgeon James Riley
Assistant Surgeon Robert M. Bateman
Assistant Surgeon Seffrine Daily
Chaplain Francis E. Butler
Sergeant Major Charles J. Field

Original company commanders
Company A - Captain John McKiernan
First Lieutenant Andrew Rogers
Second Lieutenant Thomas B. Richards
Company B - Captain Somers T. Champion
First Lieutenant Jethro V. Albertson
Second Lieutenant David Saners Risley
Company C - Captain Archibald Graham
First Lieutenant Columbus Force
Second Lieutenant Robert Parmley
Company D - Captain Ethan T. Garretson
First Lieutenant Samuel Peacock
Second Lieutenant Joseph Bateman
Company E - Captain Alexander Holmes
First Lieutenant George P. Freeman
Second Lieutenant Charles M. Marsh
Company F - Captain David Blenkow
First Lieutenant Nicholas W. Godfrey
Second Lieutenant Henry Y. Willets
Company G - Captain Charles R. Powell
First Lieutenant Ewing W. Tibbles
Second Lieutenant Nicholas Corson
Company H - Captain James Inglis, Jr
First Lieutenant Harvey Beyea
Second Lieutenant Cornelius Van Wagoner
Company I - Captain Philetus A. Stevens
First Lieutenant John F. Tomlin
Second Lieutenant Samuel E. Douglass
Company K - Captain Enoch J. Ayres
First Lieutenant Edward R. Spear
Second Lieutenant Lewis A. Pidget

See also

List of New Jersey Civil War Units

Notes

Units and formations of the Union Army from New Jersey
1862 establishments in New Jersey
Military units and formations established in 1862
Military units and formations disestablished in 1863